Cyclocheilichthys furcatus, the Mekong giant barb, is a species of cyprinid fish in the genus Cyclocheilichthys found in the Mekong.

Footnotes 

 

furcatus
Cyprinid fish of Asia
Fish described in 1989